Pseudohemihyalea porioni is a moth in the family Erebidae. It was described by Hervé de Toulgoët in 1995. It is found in Guatemala and Honduras.

References

Moths described in 1995
porioni
Arctiinae of South America